The Fremantle Football Club's 2015 season is their 21st season in the Australian Football League (AFL).  The club set a number of records during the year including winning their first McClelland Trophy for finishing first on the ladder after the completion of the home-and-away season and a club record of 17 wins during the home–and–away season.

Playing list

Between the conclusion of the 2014 season and the commencement of the 2015 season, Fremantle did not complete any trades nor recruit any free agents in the AFL trade period, despite being reported to have attempted to recruit key position players James Frawley and Aaron Black.

Key defender Luke McPharlin signed a one-year contract extension during the trade period.

Recruits and departures
At the national draft, Fremantle was expected to recruit a tall player, but instead drafted four smaller midfield or forward line players.  Two of the drafted players, Lachie Weller and Ed Langdon are younger brothers of current AFL players, St Kilda's Maverick Weller and Collingwood's Tom Langdon.  In the rookie draft, Fremantle selected Ethan Hughes, a half-back flanker originally from Bunbury, before redrafting Tanner Smith.  With their final selection they selected Irishman Sean Hurley, the club's first ever international recruit.

Ryan Crowley positive drugs test
In March 2015, Crowley was not chosen to play in any of Fremantle's pre-season games.  After being left out of the team that would travel to Sydney for the second game, it was announced that he was unavailable for selection due to undisclosed personal issues.  Three days later it was revealed that Crowley had tested position to a banned substance during the 2014 AFL season and had been serving a provisional suspension since September 2014. The sample was taken after Fremantle's Round 17 win over Greater Western Sydney and the commencement of the provisional suspension commenced after the confirmation tests (also known as B-sample) was completed in mid September.  The banned substance has not been named, but was confirmed to have come from a painkiller that was not prescribed by the club doctor.  He appeared before the AFL Tribunal in May 2015, and was found guilty and suspended for twelve months, backdated to the beginning of his provisional suspension. He became eligible to play again on 25 September 2015.

Full squad

Season summary

Pre-season matches

Premiership Season
When the 2015 AFL season fixtures were released in October 2014, Fremantle were drawn to play Port Adelaide in the opening round, a repeat of the semi-final that ended their 2014 season.  The opening month was considered very difficult, with an away game against Geelong, an away Western Derby and a home game on Anzac Day against the other team that beat Fremantle in last year's finals, Sydney.  Fremantle's game against Hawthorn was again to be played at Aurora Stadium in Launceston, Tasmania.

Home and away season

Finals

Ladder

Awards, Records & Milestones

Awards
2015 Brownlow Medal: Nat Fyfe
2015 All-Australian team: Nat Fyfe and David Mundy
2015 Leigh Matthews Trophy: Nat Fyfe
2015 22 Under 22 team: Lachie Neale

Milestones

Debuts

Match Review Panel charges
 Updated as of Round 21, 2015 season

Notes

References

Fremantle Football Club Season, 2015
Fremantle Football Club seasons